Bart is a masculine given name, usually a diminutive of Bartholomew, sometimes of Barton, Bartolomeo, etc.  

Bart is a Dutch and Ashkenazi Jewish surname, and derives from the name Bartholomäus, a German form of the biblical name Bartholomew meaning 'son of talmai' in Aramaic.

Given names
 Bart Andrus (born 1958), American football player and coach
 Bart Arens (born 1978), Dutch radio DJ
 Bart Baker (born 1986), American comedian and parody musician
 Bart Bassett (born 1961), Australian politician
 Bart Baxter, American poet
 Bart Becht (born 1956), Dutch businessman
 Bart Berman (born 1938), Dutch-Israeli pianist and composer
 Bart Biemans (born 1988), Belgian footballer
 Bart Bok (1906–1983), Dutch-American astronomer
 Bart Bongers (born 1946), Dutch water polo player
 Bart Bowen (born 1967), American cyclist
 Bart Bradley (1930–2006), Canadian ice hockey centre
 Bart Braverman (born 1946), American actor
 Bart Brentjens (born 1968), Dutch cyclist
 Bart Bryant (born 1962), American golfer
 Bart Bull, American writer, reporter, author, columnist, and critic
 Bart Bunting (born 1976), Australian blind Paralympic alpine skier
 Bart Burns (1918–2007), American actor
 Bart Buysse (born 1986), Belgian footballer
 Bart Cambré (born 1970), Belgian business theorist
 Bart Campolo, American humanist writer and former Christian pastor
 Bart Cantz (1860–1943), American baseball player
 Bart Carlier (1929–2017), Dutch footballer
 Bart Carlton, American basketball player
 Bart Claessen (born 1980), Dutch trance music DJ
 Bart Conner (born 1958), American Olympic gymnast
 Bart Cummings (1927–2015), Australian racehorse trainer
 Bart Davis (born 1955), American lawyer and politician
 Bart De Clercq (born 1986), Belgian cyclist
 Bart Decrem, Belgian-born Silicon Valley entrepreneur
 Bart Deelkens (born 1978), Belgian footballer
 Bart De Wever (born 1970), Belgian politician
 Bart de Graaff (1967–2002), Dutch television personality
 Bart de Liefde (born 1976), Dutch politician and field hockey umpire
 Bart de Ligt (1883—1938), Dutch anarcho-pacifist and antimilitarist
 Bart DeLorenzo, American theatre director and producer
 Bart Dockx (born 1981), Belgian cyclist
 Bart Dodson, American paralympic athlete
 Bart Dorsa (born 1967), American artist, photographer, and filmmaker
 Bart D. Ehrman (born 1955), American biblical scholar and atheism activist
 Bart Evans (born 1970), American baseball pitcher
 Bart Evans (polo), American polo player
 Bart Exposito (born 1970), American painter
 Bart Farley, American soccer goalkeeper
 Bart Fletcher, American actor
 Bart Forbes (born 1939), American painter and illustrator
 Bart Freundlich (born 1970), American film producer, director, and screenwriter
 Bart Giamatti (1938–1989), American university president and baseball executive
 Bart Goor (born 1973), Belgian soccer player
 Bart Gordon (born 1949), American lawyer and politician
 Bart Groothuis (born 1981), Dutch politician
 Bart Laeremans (born 1966), Belgian politician
 Bart Moeyaert (born 1964), Belgian writer
 Bart Preneel (born 1963), Belgian scientist
 Bart Ramakers (born 1963), Belgian artist and art curator
 Bart Schilperoord (born 1982), Dutch cricketer
 Bart Scott (born 1980), American football player
 Bart Sibrel (born 1964), American conspiracy theory film maker
 Bart Somers (born 1964), Belgian politician
 Bart Staes (born 1958), Belgian politician
 Bart Starr (1934–2019), American football player and coach
 Bart Stupak (born 1952), Polish-American politician
 Bart Taminiau (born 1947), Dutch field hockey player
 Bart Tanski (born 1990), American football player
 Bart Veldkamp (born 1967), Dutch speed skater
 Bart Voskamp (born 1968), Dutch cyclist
 Bart Wellens (born 1978), Belgian cyclo-cross cyclist
 Bart Wenrich, American television producer
 Bart Whiteman (1948–2006), American theatre actor, director, producer, and critic
 Bart Willoughby (born 1960), Indigenous Australian musician
 Bart Wuyts (born 1969), Belgian tennis player
 Bart Yasso, American runner and biathlete
 Bart Yates, American novelist
 Bart Zeller (born 1941), American baseball player 
 Bart Zoet (1942–1992), Dutch cyclist

Fictional characters
 Bart Allen, a DC Comics superhero called Flash, Kid Flash and Impulse
 Bart Hamilton, the third Green Goblin, a Spider-Man villain
 Bart Hawk, a military pilot who went by the codename Blackhawk in the 1940s Quality Comics incarnation
 Bart McQueen, in the soap opera Hollyoaks
 Bart Rathbone, a salesman in the radio drama and comedy series Adventures in Odyssey
 Bart Simpson, in the television series The Simpsons

Animals
 Bart the Bear (1977–2000), an Alaskan Kodiak bear who appeared in many Hollywood films
 Bart the Bear 2 (2000-2021), an Alaskan brown bear who appears in films and television

Surname
 Andrzej Bart (born 1951), Polish novelist, screenwriter and film director
 Cécile Bart (born 1958), French painter
 François Cornil Bart (1677–1755), French vice admiral
 Frank J. Bart (1883–1961), United States Army private awarded the Medal of Honor
 Harm Bart (born 1942), Dutch mathematician and economist
 Harriet Bart (born 1941), American artist
 Jean Bart (1650–1702), French naval commander and privateer
 Joey Bart (born 1996), American baseball player
 Lionel Bart (1930–1999), composer of musicals
 Pauline Bart (1930–2021), American sociologist
 Peter Bart (born 1932), American journalist, former editor-in-chief of Variety magazine
 Philippe-François Bart (1706–1784), Governor of Saint-Domingue
 Roger Bart (born 1962), American actor

See also
 Black Bart (disambiguation)
 Tony Di Bart, stage name of English singer Antonio Carmine Di Bartolomeo (born 1964)

Masculine given names
Dutch masculine given names
English masculine given names